George Francis Mulvany (1809 – 1869) was an Irish painter and the first director of the National Gallery of Ireland.

Biography
George Francis Mulvany was the son of Thomas James Mulvany, a painter and the RHA's keeper.

George Francis Mulvany studied at the Academy school and would first exhibit there in 1827.  In 1835 he became a member of the RHA, and took over as keeper upon his father's death in 1845.  Mulvany became the first director of the National Gallery of Ireland in 1862.

References

Further reading
 Hutchinson, John.James Arthur O'Connor. Dublin: The National Gallery of Ireland, 1985. .

External links 
 
 Works by George Francis Mulvany, National Gallery of Ireland

1809 births
1869 deaths
19th-century Irish painters
Irish male painters
Museum people from Dublin (city)
19th-century Irish male artists